The 1943 LSU Tigers football team represented Louisiana State University (LSU) in the 1943 college football season. LSU did not celebrate a homecoming game in 1943 due to World War II. Halfback Steve Van Buren led the nation in scoring.

Schedule

References

LSU
LSU Tigers football seasons
Orange Bowl champion seasons
LSU Tigers football